Joop Pelser (17 March 1892 – 27 July 1974) was a Dutch footballer who played for Ajax.

His brothers Jan, Adriaan and Fons were also all footballers for Ajax, as was his son Harry. Another son, also named Jan, joined the Waffen-SS during World War II, and Pelser, his wife, and three sons all joined the Nationaal-Socialistische Beweging.

References

1892 births
1974 deaths
Dutch footballers
AFC Ajax players
Footballers from Amsterdam
Association footballers not categorized by position